Each Heart Has Its Own Story (Swedish: Vart hjärta har sin saga) is a 1948 Swedish historical drama film directed by Bror Bügler and starring Edvard Persson, Inger Juel and Hilda Borgström.

The film's sets were designed by Arne Åkermark.

Cast
 Edvard Persson as Baron Henric Löwencrona af Löwstaborg  
 Inger Juel as Hildegard  
 Hilda Borgström as Aunt Louise  
 Dagmar Ebbesen as Countess Euphrosine von dem Rein  
 Henrik Schildt as Claes  
 Kenne Fant as Agne Borg, librarian 
 John Ekman as Cavalry Captain  
 Ebba Wrede as Bodil 
 Axel Högel as Tax collector  
 John Norrman as Klockaren 
 Otto Landahl as Crofter 
 Julia Cæsar as Husmansell  
 Nils Dahlgren as Servant 
 Thure Carlman as Man  
 Artur Cederborgh as Vicar 
 Theodor Olsson as Man  
 Erik Strandell as Man  
 Carin Swensson as Lina, maid

References

Bibliography 
 Qvist, Per Olov & von Bagh, Peter. Guide to the Cinema of Sweden and Finland. Greenwood Publishing Group, 2000.

External links 
 

1948 films
1940s historical drama films
Swedish historical drama films
1940s Swedish-language films
Films directed by Bror Bügler
Films set in the 1840s
Swedish black-and-white films
1948 drama films
1940s Swedish films